The canton of Saint-Apollinaire is an administrative division of the Côte-d'Or department, eastern France. It was created at the French canton reorganisation which came into effect in March 2015. Its seat is in Saint-Apollinaire.

It consists of the following communes:
 
Arceau
Arc-sur-Tille
Beaumont-sur-Vingeanne
Beire-le-Châtel
Belleneuve
Bèze
Bézouotte
Blagny-sur-Vingeanne
Bourberain
Champagne-sur-Vingeanne
Charmes
Chaume-et-Courchamp
Cheuge
Couternon
Cuiserey
Dampierre-et-Flée
Fontaine-Française
Fontenelle
Jancigny
Licey-sur-Vingeanne
Magny-Saint-Médard
Mirebeau-sur-Bèze
Montigny-Mornay-Villeneuve-sur-Vingeanne
Noiron-sur-Bèze
Oisilly
Orain
Pouilly-sur-Vingeanne
Remilly-sur-Tille
Renève
Saint-Apollinaire
Saint-Maurice-sur-Vingeanne
Saint-Seine-sur-Vingeanne
Savolles
Tanay
Trochères
Varois-et-Chaignot
Viévigne

References

Cantons of Côte-d'Or